One Hour Photo is a 2002 American psychological thriller film written and directed by Mark Romanek and starring Robin Williams, Connie Nielsen, Michael Vartan, Gary Cole, and Eriq La Salle. The film was produced by Catch 23 Entertainment, Killer Films, and John Wells Productions and released by Fox Searchlight Pictures. The film stars Williams as a photo technician who develops an unhealthy obsession with a family to whom he has long provided services.

The film premiered at the 2002 Sundance Film Festival, was given a limited release on August 21, 2002, and was given a wider release on September 13. One Hour Photo received positive reviews from film critics, including praise for Williams's against-type performance, which earned him a Saturn Award for Best Actor. The film was also a commercial success, grossing $52.2 million against a $12 million budget.

Plot
Seymour "Sy" Parrish is a photo technician at a one-hour photo in big-box store SavMart. He lives alone, has no friends or love life, and lives only for his work, which he considers a "vital service". His favorite customers are the Yorkin family, whose photos he has developed for many years. Over the years, he has grown obsessed with the family, enshrining them in his home with their photos that he secretly copies. However, as he is shy and socially inept, his attempts to become closer to the family are gently rebuffed.

Sy eventually manages to spark a connection with Nina Yorkin when he pretends to be interested in a book that he saw her purchase. Nina learns that Sy lives a solitary existence, something only her son Jake had considered previously. The next day, store manager Bill Owens finishes an audit investigation on company expenditures. He discovers that Sy, over the span of nine years, has printed many more prints than have been ordered and paid for, as well as spacing out on the job, taking unauthorized 90-minute lunch breaks, giving away free merchandise (including a camera for Jake), and causing an altercation with the developing machine's maintenance person in front of customers. This results in Sy being fired from SavMart, but Bill allows him to finish the week. 

While inspecting a customer's photos, Sy discovers that Will Yorkin is having an extramarital affair, and his idyllic conception of the Yorkins as the perfect family is shattered. He surreptitiously places the photos of Will and his mistress, Maya Burson, into a packet of photos that Nina was scheduled to pick up. Meanwhile, Sy then takes pictures paparazzi-style of Bill's young daughter, then sends the film with the photos to Yoshi (another SavMart employee), who then turns them over to Bill. This triggers a police investigation into Sy.

While detectives James Van Der Zee and Paul Outerbridge discover Sy's obsession, Sy confronts Will and Maya during a rendezvous in their hotel room. Armed with a knife and a camera, Sy forces the lovers to pose naked in sexual positions while he takes pictures. After the confrontation, Sy notices that the police have arrived at the hotel, and escapes through an emergency exit. The exit door trips an alarm, and Van Der Zee pursues Sy while Outerbridge finds Will and Maya physically unharmed but emotionally traumatized. The police apprehend Sy in the parking garage. Upon being arrested, Sy claims, "I just took pictures."

In the police interrogation room, Van Der Zee asks Sy why he terrorized Will and Maya. Sy says that he can tell Van Der Zee is a good father who would never commit adultery or take "disgusting, sick, degrading pictures" of his children (suggesting that Sy's own father exploited him for child pornography), and the affair between Will and Maya sparked his traumatic memory - which Sy had to avenge. Satisfied with his candid testimony, Van Der Zee expresses his appreciation. Sy then asks for the pictures that he took at the hotel. The detective describes the pictures as "evidence", but relents and gives them to Sy, who displays them on the table. They appear to be only shots of objects and furnishings of a hotel room. After he is left alone in the room, Sy imagines himself as being part of a happy family picture of the Yorkins, with Will's arm around a smiling Sy.

Cast
 Robin Williams as Seymour "Sy" Parrish
 Michael Vartan as Will Yorkin
 Connie Nielsen as Nina Yorkin
 Gary Cole as Bill Owens, Manager
 Eriq La Salle as Det. James Van Der Zee
 Clark Gregg as Det. Paul Outerbridge
 Paul H. Kim as Yoshi Araki
 Erin Daniels as Maya Burson
 Dylan Smith as Jake Yorkin
 Christina Magargle as Mrs. von Unwerth
 David Moreland as Mr. Siskind
 Jim Rash as Amateur Porn Guy
 Nick Searcy as Larry the repairman

Production

Trent Reznor, of the band Nine Inch Nails, composed the original film score, but Romanek opted not to use it. Some of the music evolved into the material on the Nine Inch Nails EP Still.

In accordance with the photography-themed movie, the names of several characters are drawn from actual photographers: Sy's assistant at the Savmart, Yoshi Araki (named for Nobuyoshi Araki), manager Bill Owens (Gary Cole); Det. Van Der Zee (James Van Der Zee); Det. Outerbridge (Paul Outerbridge); Maya Burson (Nancy Burson); and Savmart customers Mrs. von Unwerth (Ellen von Unwerth) and Mr. Siskind (Aaron Siskind).

In one of the voice-over pieces Sy can be heard to say, "They actually believe that any idiot that attends a two-day seminar can master the art of making beautiful prints in less than an hour. But of course, like most things, there's far more to it than meets the eye." Williams prepared for the role by training for two and-a-half days in a Southern California photo development lab.

In an interview, Romanek said that he was inspired to create this movie by films from the 1970s about "lonely men", notably Taxi Driver (1976).

In the DVD commentary, Romanek says that Jack Nicholson was first approached to play the lead character. Nicholson turned down the role reportedly because he thought the character was too similar to the role he played in The Shining (1980).

Reception

Critical response
On review aggregator website Rotten Tomatoes, One Hour Photo holds an approval rating of 81% based on 199 reviews, with an average rating of 7.00/10. The site's critics consensus reads: "Robin Williams is very effective in this creepy, well-shot thriller." At Metacritic the film has a weighted average score of 64 out of 100, based on 35 critics, indicating "generally favorable reviews". Audiences polled by CinemaScore gave the film an average grade of "C" on an A+ to F scale.

Roger Ebert of the Chicago Sun-Times gave the film three and a half stars and wrote: "Robin Williams plays Sy, another of his open-faced, smiling madmen, like the killer in Insomnia. He does this so well you don't have the slightest difficulty accepting him in the role." Mick LaSalle of the San Francisco Chronicle noted that the film is "not nearly as intelligent, thoughtful or penetrating as it promises to be. Yet the consistent delicacy and emotional clarity of Williams' acting in One Hour Photo makes the picture impossible to dismiss."

Box office
The film's limited release began on August 21, 2002 in seven theaters, opening to a $321,515 weekend, with an average of $45,930 per theater. Its wide release began on September 13, with a 1,212 theater count. Still, the film made just over $8 million that weekend, and went on to gross $31,597,131 in the US, with an additional $20,626,175 in overseas territories, for an international total of $52,223,306; this was a moderate box office success, as the budget was around $12 million.

Accolades

See also
List of films featuring surveillance

References

External links

2002 films
2000s psychological drama films
2002 independent films
2000s mystery films
2002 psychological thriller films
Adultery in films
American psychological drama films
American independent films
American mystery films
American thriller films
Films about adultery in the United States
Films about families
Films about photographers
American films about revenge
Films about security and surveillance
Films about stalking
Films directed by Mark Romanek
Films produced by Christine Vachon
Films set in department stores
Films set in hotels
Films set in Los Angeles
Fox Searchlight Pictures films
Killer Films films
Films scored by Reinhold Heil
Films scored by Johnny Klimek
2002 drama films
2000s English-language films
2000s American films